Hillcrest is a village located in Ogle County, Illinois, United States. The 2010 census lists its population at 1,326, up from 1,158 in 2000.

Geography
Hillcrest is located at  (41.952924, −89.068216).

Demographics

At the 2000 census, there were 1,158 people, 342 households and 297 families residing in the village. The racial makeup of the village was 88.51% White, 0.35% African American, 0.60% Native American, 0.26% Asian, 9.67% from other races, and 0.60% from two or more races. Hispanic or Latino of any race were 21.24% of the population.

There were 342 households, of which 52.3% had children under the age of 18 living with them, 73.7% were married couples living together, 7.9% had a female householder with no husband present, and 12.9% were non-families. 10.2% of all households were made up of individuals, and 1.5% had someone living alone who was 65 years of age or older. The average household size was 3.39 and the average family size was 3.61.

Age distribution was 36.4% under the age of 18, 7.8% from 18 to 24, 33.9% from 25 to 44, 16.6% from 45 to 64, and 5.4% who were 65 years of age or older. The median age was 30 years. For every 100 females, there were 107.5 males. For every 100 females age 18 and over, there were 98.1 males.

The median household income was $49,821, and the median family income was $49,375. Males had a median income of $36,250 versus $22,885 for females. The per capita income for the village was $15,340. About 5.3% of families and 6.1% of the population were below the poverty line, including 8.6% of those under age 18 and none of those age 65 or over.

References

Villages in Ogle County, Illinois
Villages in Illinois